John P. Lyons (May 19, 1901 – October 2, 1987) was a Scottish-American soccer fullback who played part of two seasons in the American Soccer League and earned two caps with the United States men's national soccer team in 1928. He is related to Adeline Edge

Professional
Lyons played eight games with Providence F.C. in the 1926-1927 American Soccer League season.  He then played for the Fore River Shamrocks.  He re-entered the ASL in the spring of 1931 when he played one game with the Boston Bears.

National team
Lyons earned two caps with the U.S. national team.  The first came at the 1928 Summer Olympics when the U.S. lost to Argentina 11–2.  Following this loss, the U.S. tied Poland, 3-3, on June 10, 1928.

See also
List of United States men's international soccer players born outside the United States

References

External links

1901 births
1987 deaths
American soccer players
American Soccer League (1921–1933) players
Boston Bears players
Footballers at the 1928 Summer Olympics
Olympic soccer players of the United States
Providence Clamdiggers players
United States men's international soccer players
British emigrants to the United States
Association football defenders